Sunny Bank is a historic home located near South Garden, Albemarle County, Virginia. It was started in 1797, and is a two-story, frame Palladian style house. It features a two-level pedimented portico projecting from the center three bays.  The wings were originally one-story, but later raised to two stories within 20 years of their original construction.  Also on the property are a contributing one-story frame office, kitchen and laundry building, smokehouse, log shed, and family cemetery.

It was added to the National Register of Historic Places in 1976.

References

External links
Sunny Bank, State Route 712 vicinity, North Garden, Albemarle County, VA: 7 measured drawings and 7 data pages at Historic American Buildings Survey

Plantation houses in Virginia
Houses on the National Register of Historic Places in Virginia
Palladian Revival architecture in Virginia
Houses completed in 1797
Houses in Albemarle County, Virginia
National Register of Historic Places in Albemarle County, Virginia
Historic American Buildings Survey in Virginia